Florida Grand Opera (FGO) is an American opera company based in Miami, Florida. It is the oldest performing arts organization in Florida and the seventh oldest opera company in the United States. FGO was created in 1994 from the consolidation of two opera companies in the Miami-Fort Lauderdale region: Opera Guild of Greater Miami, founded in 1941 by Arturo di Filippi; and the Opera Guild, Inc. of Fort Lauderdale, formed in 1945.

Location
FGO is the resident company at the Ziff Ballet Opera House, located in the Adrienne Arsht Center for the Performing Arts in Miami, and also at the Au-Rene Theater at the Broward Center for the Performing Arts in Fort Lauderdale. FGO sometimes stages at other area theaters, including Lauderhill Performing Arts Center in Broward County and the Miami Shrine Temple in Miami-Dade.

History

Founding and early years
In 1941, the company was founded as the Opera Guild of Greater Miami by Arturo di Filippi, a tenor and voice teacher at the University of Miami. It later became known as the Greater Miami Opera Association. 
di Filippi brought many international stars to the Miami stage, among them a then-unknown Luciano Pavarotti who replaced an ailing colleague in a 1965 production of Lucia di Lammermoor starring Joan Sutherland.  He went on to sing many other roles on the Greater Miami Opera stage.

1950-1996
Under the name the "Greater Miami Opera", Emerson Buckley was the company's music director from 1950 to 1973 and then served as artistic director and principal conductor through 1986. Willie Anthony Waters, who had become Chorus Master of the company in 1982, then served as artistic director from 1986 through 1992 and principal guest conductor from 1992 to 1995.  From 1973 - 1985, Robert "Bob" Herman, Rudolf Bing's former assistant general manager at the Metropolitan Opera, helmed the Greater Miami Opera. This period continued to see international singers appearing on the stage and over 35 original productions. Under Herman's leadership, the opera achieved national prominence. Following Herman's retirement, Robert Heuer served as General Director from 1985 - 2012, when he was replaced by Susan T. Danis. She is FGO's first female General Director and CEO.

1997-present
Stewart Robertson was FGO music director from 1997 to 2010. On June 1, 2011, Ramón Tebar became FGO's music director. He also became the first Spanish conductor to lead both an American opera company and an American symphony. In 2014, Tebar took the title of principal conductor with the company. FGO does not currently employ a principal conductor, instead relying on a series of guest conductors including Gregory Buchalter,  Jerri Lynn Johnson, Michael Ching, Anthony Barrese, and Marlene Urbay. In 2022, Marlon Daniel joined the music staff as Associate Conductor.

In 2006, FGO moved its principal performing venue from the Dade County Auditorium to the new Adrienne Arsht Center for the Performing Arts. After Danis took the reins in 2012, she retired the more than $19 million that had accumulated under her predecessor by selling the company's Fort Lauderdale rehearsal space, scaling back the season, and other tactics.  2022 marks Danis' decade of leadership at FGO, during which time she has also established a "Made in Miami" series, kept the opera afloat through the global COVID-19 pandemic, and championed contemporary works.

References

External links
 
 Adrienne Arsht Center for the Performing Arts
 Lawrence A. Johnson, "Curtain to ring down for FGO's Stewart Robertson". South Florida Classical Review, 5 February 2009
 Interview with Emerson Buckley by Bruce Duffie, April 16, 1986

Culture of Miami
American opera companies
Tourist attractions in Miami
Musical groups established in 1941
Performing arts in Florida
1941 establishments in Florida